Karanvir Sharma (born 18 September 1985) is a Hindi film, web and television actor. He is widely known for portraying Shaurya Sabherwal in Shaurya Aur Anokhi Ki Kahani.

Career 
He debuted with the film Sadda Adda. Other film roles include Zid (2014), Azhar (2016), and Shaadi Mein Zaroor Aana (2017). He made his television debut with Colors TV's 24. He later featured in Siyaasat, Girl in the City Chapter 2 and Haq Se. In 2018, he played the role of Nagarjuna Kutty in the SAB TV's Mangalam Dangalam. He came into prominence through his portrayal of Shaurya Sabherwal in StarPlus's Shaurya Aur Anokhi Ki Kahani. He will next be seen playing a lawyer in the upcoming Bollywood movie "A Thursday" opposite " Yami Gautam".

Filmography

Television

Films

Web/OTT

Music Videos

References

External links 
 
 

21st-century Indian male actors
Indian male film actors
Indian male television actors
Indian male models
1984 births
Living people